North Oil Company (NOC) is a crude oil and natural gas company based in Qatar.

History
The creation of the North Oil Company has been announced in June 2016 by QatarEnergy as a joint venture with TotalEnergies (30%) to develop and operate the Al Shaheen oil field for 25 years.
Operations along with production, sale and export of crude oil started on July 14, 2017. TotalEnergies announced to invest around $2 billion into the oilfield between 2017 – 2022 and QatarEnergy announced that total investments into the field would be around $3.5 billion.

From 1992 – 2017, the Al Shaheen Oil Field had been developed and operated by Maersk Oil.

In July 2017, the first crude tanker from Al Shaheen was loaded. In November 2018, it was announced that PetroVietnam was contracted by NOC in order to further develop the second phase of the field, including the erection of three new wellhead platforms and three bridges until 2020.

Corporate structure
NOC is led by chief executive officer Frederic Paux. Khalid al Rumaihi is chairman of the board of directors. Other members of the board are Abdulaziz Al-Mannai, Jassim Al-Marzouqi, Mohammed Al Ghanem, Rashid Al Fehaidi, Hamad Al-Baker, Lionel Levha, Pierre Ranger and Laurent Wolffsheim.

Operations
North Oil operates the Al Shaheen Oil Field. The field is situated in Qatari waters, around 180 kilometers north from Doha, 80 kilometers north of Ras Laffan and the north-east coast of Qatar. Al Shaheen is the largest offshore field in Qatar and is part of the South Pars/North Dome Gas-Condensate field, stretching across 9,700 square kilometres in Iranian and Qatari waters. The field is considered one of the largest and most complex oilfields in the world.

The field covers more than 40% of Qatars total oil production.

The companies current goal is to maintain current production and output levels from the field, which is considered difficult in complex fields like Al Shaheen, given the natural decrease of pressure and resources. In order to achieve their current goal, the company plans to drill more than 100 new wells until 2022.

The Al Shaheen oil field, situated off the north-east coast of Qatar, is one of the largest and most complex of its kind in the world. Its 100 million barrels per annum comprise 45% of Qatar's Oil production.

References

External links 

 "Qatar Petroleum Establishes “NORTH OIL COMPANY” for the Future Development and Operation of Al-Shaheen Oil Field and Selects Total as its Partner"
 Company web Site

Oil and gas companies of Qatar
Energy companies established in 2017
Qatari companies established in 2017